Arthur Drummond Downes (23 February 1883, in Kelvinside, Glasgow – 12 September 1956, in Helensburgh) was a Scottish sailor who competed for the Royal Clyde Yacht Club at the 1908 Summer Olympics.

Son of a Kelvinside paper merchant, Downes was qualified in medicine (MA, MBChB) at the University of Glasgow; he practiced first at Glasgow, then at Helensburgh for over forty years.

He was a crew member of the Scottish boat Hera, which won the gold medal in the 12 metre class.

In 1920, Downes married Mary Angela, daughter of merchant James Young, of Rockmount, Helensburgh.

References

External links 
 
 

1883 births
1956 deaths
Scottish male sailors (sport)
Sailors at the 1908 Summer Olympics – 12 Metre
Olympic sailors of Great Britain
British male sailors (sport)
Olympic gold medallists for Great Britain
Olympic medalists in sailing
Scottish Olympic medallists
Sportspeople from Glasgow
Medalists at the 1908 Summer Olympics